Cancellicula is a genus of medium-sized sea snails, marine gastropod molluscs in the family Cancellariidae, the nutmeg snails.

Species
According to the World Register of Marine Species (WoRMS), the following species with valid names are within the genus Cancellicula :
 Cancellicula aethiopica (Thiele, 1925)
 Cancellicula jonasi (de Barros & Petit, 2007)
 Cancellicula microscopica (Dall, 1889)

References

Cancellariidae